1223 Neckar, provisional designation , is a stony Koronian asteroid from the outer region of the asteroid belt, approximately  in diameter. Discovered by Karl Reinmuth at Heidelberg Observatory in 1931, the asteroid was named for the German river Neckar. The S-type asteroid has a rotation period of 7.8 hours.

Discovery 

Neckar was discovered on 6 October 1931, by German astronomer Karl Reinmuth at Heidelberg Observatory in southwest Germany. Five nights later, it was independently discovered by Fernand Rigaux at Uccle in Belgium. The Minor Planet Center only acknowledges the first discoverer.

Orbit and classification 

Neckar is a core member of the Koronis family, a very large outer asteroid family with nearly co-planar ecliptical orbits. The family, named after 158 Koronis, is thought to have been formed at least two billion years ago in a catastrophic collision between two larger bodies. It orbits the Sun in the outer main-belt at a distance of 2.7–3.0 AU once every 4 years and 10 months (1,775 days; semi-major axis of 2.87 AU). Its orbit has an eccentricity of 0.06 and an inclination of 3° with respect to the ecliptic.

Physical characteristics 

In the Tholen classification, Neckar is a common stony S-type asteroid. It has also been characterized as an S-type by Pan-STARRS.

Rotation period 

Best rated rotational lightcurve of Neckar gave a rotation period of 7.763 and 7.81 hours with a brightness variation of 0.18 and 0.45 magnitude, respectively. Photometric observations taken by Richard Binzel and Ed Tedesco in the 1970s and 1980s, however, gave a longer period and are now considered incorrect.

Two lightcurves in the R-band with a period of 7.80 and 7.8273 hours (Δ0.21/0.28 mag) were also obtained at the Palomar Transient Factory in 2010 and 2014, respectively. Neckars spin axes has been determined several times. The best rated result, from a group led by Polish astronomers, gave two poles at (70.0°, 45.0°) and (225.0°, 42.0°) in ecliptic coordinates.

Diameter and albedo 

According to the surveys carried out by the Japanese Akari satellite and NASA's Wide-field Infrared Survey Explorer with its subsequent NEOWISE mission, Neckar measures between 22.783 and 26.07 kilometers in diameter, and its surface has an albedo between 0.146 and 0.201. The Collaborative Asteroid Lightcurve Link adopts an albedo of 0.123 obtained by Morrison in the 1970s, and derives a diameter of 27.96 kilometers using an absolute magnitude of 10.66.

Naming 

This minor planet was named after the river Neckar, running through the southwestern parts of Germany and in particular through the city of Heidelberg, location of the discovering observatory. The river origins in the Black Forrest and flows into the Rhine river. Naming citation was first mentioned in The Names of the Minor Planets by Paul Herget in 1955.

Notes

References

External links 
 Asteroid Lightcurve Database (LCDB), query form (info )
 Dictionary of Minor Planet Names, Google books
 Asteroids and comets rotation curves, CdR – Observatoire de Genève, Raoul Behrend
 Discovery Circumstances: Numbered Minor Planets (1)-(5000) – Minor Planet Center
 
 

001223
Discoveries by Karl Wilhelm Reinmuth
Named minor planets
001223
19311006